Sergeant Albert White VC (1 December 1892 in Liverpool – 19 May 1917) was an English recipient of the Victoria Cross, the highest and most prestigious award for gallantry in the face of the enemy that can be awarded to British and Commonwealth forces.

Details
White was 24 years old, and a sergeant in the 2nd Battalion, The South Wales Borderers, British Army during the First World War when the following deed took place for which he was awarded the VC.

On 19 May 1917 at Monchy-le-Preux, France, Sergeant White, realising during an attack that one of the enemy's machine-guns, which had previously not been located, would hold up the whole advance of his company, dashed ahead to capture the gun. When within a few yards of it, he fell riddled with bullets, having willingly sacrificed his life in an attempt to secure the success of the operation.

References

Monuments to Courage (David Harvey, 1999)
The Register of the Victoria Cross (This England, 1997)
Liverpool VCs (James Murphy, Pen and Sword Books, 2008)

1892 births
1917 deaths
British World War I recipients of the Victoria Cross
South Wales Borderers soldiers
British Army personnel of World War I
British military personnel killed in World War I
Victoria Cross awardees from Liverpool
British Army recipients of the Victoria Cross